Broadway Bridge is an arch bridge that spans the South Saskatchewan River in Saskatoon, Saskatchewan, Canada.

History

The bridge was constructed as a "make-work" project during the Great Depression. It was built in 1932 by the contractor R.J. Arrand Construction Co. It was designed by Chalmers Jack (C. J.) MacKenzie (on leave from his post as Dean of Engineering at the University of Saskatchewan). For this reason, the bridge was originally called The Dean's Bridge in its early period; it was formally named the Broadway Bridge as it connects Broadway Avenue on the east shore with 19th Street and 4th Avenue in Saskatoon's downtown core. The city once considered changing the name to George V Bridge in honour of the King.

Construction of the bridge employed 1,593 men, who worked in three shifts around the clock. The total cost at the time of construction was $850,000 CAD. In 1933, the streetcar lines of the Saskatoon Municipal Railway were re-routed from the Traffic Bridge to the Broadway Bridge.

The year-long closure of the nearby Traffic Bridge in late 2005 greatly increased the amount of daily traffic crossing the bridge. The bridge was subsequently closed permanently, leaving the Broadway Bridge as a long-term alternate route until the replacement Traffic Bridge was opened in 2018.

In popular culture 
The Broadway Bridge is mentioned in Joni Mitchell's song "Cherokee Louise" on the album Night Ride Home. Joni spent part of her childhood and teenage years in Saskatoon. The Bessborough Hotel, iconically associated with the Broadway Bridge, can be seen in a self-portrait by Mitchell on the cover of her Clouds album.

See also 
 List of crossings of the South Saskatchewan River
 List of bridges in Canada
 List of bridges

References

External links
 

Bridges completed in 1932
Bridges in Saskatoon
Deck arch bridges
Concrete bridges in Canada
Road bridges in Saskatchewan